Tin-Tin Kyrano is a fictional character introduced in the 1960s British Supermarionation puppet television series Thunderbirds. In the original TV series and its film sequels, the voice of Tin-Tin was provided by actress Christine Finn. In the live-action film adaptation, the character was played by Vanessa Hudgens, while in the remake series, she was voiced by Angel Coulby.

Thunderbirds (1965–66)

Background
Sylvia Anderson, Thunderbirds co-producer and character co-creator, writes that Tin-Tin was conceived mainly to "redress the balance" of the "male-dominated" primary puppet cast. Anderson regrets that the backstories that she had devised for Tin-Tin and her father mostly progressed no further than the script, and that the pair's on-screen visibility was limited, in her view, to a series of cameo appearances.

The Supermarionation puppet was sculpted by Christine Glanville.

Character biography
Born on 20 June 2004 or 2043, Tin-Tin is the daughter of Kyrano – an old friend of, and manservant to, International Rescue founder Jeff Tracy. She joins the organisation shortly after it starts operations, having inadvertently become involved in IR's first mission when the maiden flight of Fireflash, in which she is travelling from London to Tokyo, is sabotaged by her villainous half-uncle The Hood ("Trapped in the Sky"). Her further education, specialising in mathematics and engineering, was fully paid for by Jeff in gratitude for her father's service to him ("Trapped in the Sky").

Tin-Tin performs a variety of roles on Tracy Island, IR's base of operations. They range from a secretary to Jeff ("Terror in New York City"), to a laboratory assistant to the scientist and engineer Brains ("City of Fire", "Danger at Ocean Deep") to active participation in missions, most notably the rescue of the Sun Probe spaceship ("Sun Probe"). She is also known to accompany Lady Penelope on espionage missions ("The Cham-Cham") and is a qualified pilot. Tin-Tin is romantically involved with Alan Tracy, although their relationship is briefly strained when Tin-Tin's ex-boyfriend, Eddie Houseman, visits the island ("End of the Road").

Name
Tin-Tin's name was derived from the Malaysian term for "sweet".

For the 2010s remake, Thunderbirds Are Go, Tin-Tin was renamed Tanusha "Kayo" Kyrano due to potential copyright issues in respect of the Hergé comic book character Tintin.

There is no character for "ti" in Japanese, and "chi" is usually substituted; however, chin-chin is a Japanese colloquialism for phallus. In Japan, broadcasts of TV series typically include subtitles introducing the names of characters when they first appear on-screen, and Thunderbirds episodes introduced Tin-Tin as "Min-Min".

Reception
Sylvia Anderson remembered the character as "mostly house-bound" and less of an adventurer than Lady Penelope, although she "had her followers" and served as a "decorative sidekick to her macho boss". Commentators are divided on the subject of Tin-Tin's significance to the narrative. Jack Hagerty and Jon C. Rogers argue that prior to her sizeable role in Thunderbird 6, and despite her status as a series regular, the character was "usually nothing more than window-dressing, with her actual contributions being a bit vague". David Ryan of website DVD Verdict characterised Tin-Tin as "part hanger-around-the-house, part local-squeeze-for-Alan's-pleasure, and 99 percent useless".

Stephen La Rivière is less critical, asserting that over the course of the series the character moved away "from being the submissive hired help to a more assertive, independent role". However, he concedes that her development was overshadowed by Lady Penelope's. John Peel offers a similar assessment, criticising the character's appearance in the first episode, "Trapped in the Sky" ("a helpless-female-to-be-rescued role"), but praising her contributions in "Sun Probe" and "The Cham-Cham" (stating that in the latter she "really comes into her own", emerging as Penelope's "sidekick"). He argues that compared to other Anderson series, Thunderbirds gave its minority of female characters more opportunities to prove their worth. Daniel O'Brien describes Tin-Tin, as well as Penelope and Grandma Tracy, as "intelligent" and "independent-minded", praising Thunderbirds for its progressive attitude to characterisation.

The Star Observer describes Tin-Tin as a "kooky icon of 60s Orientalism". Nicholas J. Cull cites the character's Malaysian nationality and status as a "positive non-white character" as examples of the series' rejection of ethno-national stereotyping. This contrasts with her relative, the Hood, whose Eastern appearance and manner were intrinsic to his villainy. Glenn Erickson of DVD Talk presents an opposing view, arguing that while Thunderbirds often resorted to stereotypes, it employed them "with some sensitivity – all except for Tin-Tin", whom he characterises negatively as a "literal China doll". Kate Hunt of the University of Glasgow, who studied the series' presentation of tobacco smoking, observes that in marked contrast with prolific smokers like Penelope, Tin-Tin was seen "incongruously" and "inconsistently" with a cigarette in just one episode ("End of the Road"). She also wrote that the character filled a socially ambiguous position in the Tracy Island household, appearing variously as an "adopted daughter, secretary, and occasional member of the International Rescue team".

Thunderbirds (2004)

In the 2004 live-action film, Thunderbirds, in which Tin-Tin plays a significant role, the character is portrayed by Vanessa Hudgens. In addition to being younger than in the TV series, Tin-Tin is no longer Malaysian but depicted as being of Indian descent. Her mother, Onaha, also lives on Tracy Island. She possesses telekinesis and mind control powers similar to those of her half-uncle, the Hood (and, similarly, weakens momentarily as a side-effect of their use).

Reception
Vanessa Hudgens' live-action portrayal of the character has also polarised opinion. DVD Verdict's Dennis Prince comments that the re-imagined, younger Tin-Tin is "full of spunk and plenty of girl-power attitude (which never becomes truly obnoxious, mind you)", and a "rather thinly stretched adaptation" of the original. James Gray of the website The Digital Fix considers the character "not too bad, although she does spend the entire time smiling her head off, even in scenes where it really isn't that appropriate". Alex Hewison, commenting for the same website, is dismissive, judging the character a victim of gender tokenism and "superfluity" as regards her "hyper-chaste love subplot" with Alan (Brady Corbet). Erickson writes positively of the decision to have Tin-Tin inherit the Hood's "inscrutable Oriental wizardry", use of which is indicated on-screen by her eyes becoming "cat-like, vertical slits – a nice touch". Critics have written of perceived similarities between the live-action Tin-Tin and the fictional characters Carmen Cortez (of the Spy Kids film series) and Hermione Granger (of the Harry Potter novel and film series).

Thunderbirds Are Go (2015–20)

For the 2010s remake, Thunderbirds Are Go, Tin-Tin was renamed Tanusha "Kayo" Kyrano. Kayo is Tracy Island's head of security and often serves as Alan's co-pilot on board Thunderbird 3. At the conclusion of the pilot episode, she is confirmed to be the Hood's niece, but it would appear that only Jeff and Grandma Tracy are aware of her ties to the villain, with the Hood taunting her about her keeping that information secret from the Tracy brothers. The Hood reveals this relationship to the brothers during the final episode of the first season, and Kayo later tells them that Jeff had decided to keep it a secret from them. At the end of the pilot, she is given her own Thunderbird vehicle: Thunderbird Shadow.

Commenting that the remake brings Tin-Tin "up to date", Carolyn Percy of Wales Arts Review praises how Kayo's character development is no longer devoted entirely to "potential love interests". She also applauds the storylines for probing the character's relationship with The Hood in greater detail than the "vague references" of the original series, stating that this produces a "suspenseful subplot".

References

Works cited

External links
 Thunderbirds characters

British female characters in television
Female characters in animated series
Female characters in film
Female characters in television
Fictional astronauts
Fictional female engineers
Fictional female scientists
Fictional hypnotists and indoctrinators
Fictional Malaysian people
Fictional mathematicians
Fictional secretaries
Fictional security guards
Fictional telekinetics
Film characters introduced in 1966
Film sidekicks
Indian film characters
Teenage characters in film
Television characters introduced in 1965
Television sidekicks
Thunderbirds (TV series) characters
Fictional people from the 21st-century